The 2017 Men's Queensland Basketball League season was the 32nd running of the competition.

The teams for this season were: Brisbane Capitals, Brisbane Spartans, Cairns Marlins, Gladstone Port City Power, Gold Coast Rollers, Ipswich Force, Logan Thunder, Mackay Meteors, Rockhampton Rockets, South West Metro Pirates, Sunshine Coast Phoenix, Toowoomba Mountaineers, Townsville Heat and USC Rip City.

Team information

Standings

Finals

Awards

Player of the Week

Coach of the Month

Statistics leaders

Regular season
 Most Valuable Player: Shaun Bruce (Mackay Meteors)
 Coach of the Year: Cameron Tragardh (Mackay Meteors)
 U23 Youth Player of the Year: Matthew Kenyon (Sunshine Coast Phoenix)
 All-League Team:
 G: Shaun Bruce (Mackay Meteors)
 G: Ray Willis (Gladstone Port City Power)
 F: Lucas Walker (Mackay Meteors)
 F: Tanner McGrew (South West Metro Pirates)
 C: Mitchell Young (Logan Thunder)

Finals
 Grand Final MVP: Josh Wilcher (Townsville Heat)

Notes

References

External links
 2017 QBL Official Draw
 Cairns Marlins facing quality rivals in Queensland Basketball League
 Quarter-finals preview
 Quarter-finals wrap
 Semi-finals preview
 Semi-finals wrap
 Grand Final preview
 Season reviews –  

2017
2016–17 in Australian basketball
2017–18 in Australian basketball